Alexandre Dae Jin Lee (born September 2, 1977) is a Brazilian judoka who competed in the men's extra-lightweight category. He represented his nation Brazil in the 60-kg division at the 2004 Summer Olympics, and later captured a bronze medal at the 2007 Pan American Games in Rio de Janeiro.

Lee qualified for the Brazilian squad in the men's extra-lightweight class (60 kg) at the 2004 Summer Olympics in Athens, based on the nation's entry to the top 22 for his own division in the world rankings by the International Judo Federation. He conceded with three shido penalties and succumbed to a waza-ari hold and a pacifying assault from Armenia's Armen Nazaryan during their opening match.

When his country Brazil hosted the 2007 Pan American Games in Rio de Janeiro, Lee thwarted Peruvian judoka Juan Miguel Postigos to pick up a bronze medal in the men's 60-kg division.

References

External links

UOL Esporte Bio 

1977 births
Living people
Olympic judoka of Brazil
Judoka at the 2004 Summer Olympics
Judoka at the 2007 Pan American Games
Pan American Games bronze medalists for Brazil
People from Mogi das Cruzes
Brazilian male judoka
Brazilian people of Korean descent
Pan American Games medalists in judo
Medalists at the 2007 Pan American Games
Sportspeople from São Paulo (state)
20th-century Brazilian people